Cotton Patch Cafe is a Dallas, Texas-based  American restaurant chain. Originally opened in Nacogdoches, Texas in 1989, the chain now has casual dining restaurants located in the states of Texas, New Mexico and Oklahoma.

Locations 
In May 2020, the Cotton Patch Cafe in Claremore, as well as numerous other sites in the business, including Ada, Ardmore, Broken Arrow, Claremore, Siloam Springs, and Springdale, announced they would be permanently closed due to the long-term effects of COVID-19.

References

External links

Economy of the Southwestern United States
Nacogdoches, Texas
Regional restaurant chains in the United States
Restaurants established in 1989
Restaurants in Texas
1989 establishments in Texas